Glenn Campbell (born 1976) is a Scottish news and current affairs broadcaster, formerly political editor for BBC Scotland. He grew up on Islay and studied at the University of Glasgow.

His career began in commercial radio. A former head of news and sport at Scot FM, he also presented the station's news magazine 'Lunchtime Live' which won a silver Sony Award in 1999.

Campbell joined BBC Scotland in 2001, originally working for their radio station, BBC Radio Scotland. Currently, he works for their television arm, and has regularly reported and presented on programmes such as Reporting Scotland and Scotland 2016. He also presented the network's coverage of the 2007 Scottish election and contributes regularly on Good Morning Scotland. He has been a stand-in presenter on Radio 4's PM programme. Campbell hosted BBC Scotland's coverage of the 2015 general election and anchored coverage of the 2016 Scottish Parliament election.

On 25 August 2014, Campbell moderated the second Scottish independence debate between Alistair Darling and Alex Salmond in Glasgow. He then hosted the referendum result programme on BBC One Scotland on 18 September 2014.

On 15 December 2020, Campbell was announced as BBC Scotland's political editor, beginning in January 2021.

References

External links
Glenn Campbell at bbc.co.uk/news

1976 births
Alumni of the University of Glasgow
BBC Scotland newsreaders and journalists
Living people
Scottish television presenters
People from Islay
Scottish political commentators